Alastair Llewellyn John Redfern (born 1 September 1948) is a retired Church of England bishop, who served as Bishop of Derby from 2005 to 2018.

Early life and education
Redfern studied at Christ Church, Oxford. He received a Doctor of Philosophy (PhD) degree in 2001 from the University of Bristol. His doctoral thesis was titled "Oversight and authority in the nineteenth century church of England: a case study of Bishop Samuel Wilberforce".

Ordained ministry
Redfern was ordained a deacon at Petertide 1976 (27 June) and a priest the following Petertide (26 June 1977), both times by Kenneth Skelton, Bishop of Lichfield, at Lichfield Cathedral. He served as a curate in Wolverhampton. He then became a lecturer and later vice principal of Ripon College Cuddesdon. He was also an honorary curate of Church of All Saints, Cuddesdon between 1983 and 1987. From 1987 to 1997 he was the Canon Theologian of Bristol Cathedral.

Episcopal ministry

He was ordained and consecrated to the episcopate on 2 December 1997 at Southwark Cathedral (by George Carey, Archbishop of Canterbury) to become suffragan Bishop of Grantham. In 2005, he was translated to be the Bishop of Derby. He was a Member (Lord Spiritual) of the House of Lords from 2010 to 2018.

Redfern retired effective 31 August 2018.

Personal life
In 1974, Redfern married Jane Valerie Straw. Together they had two daughters. His first wife died in 2004. In 2006, he married Caroline Boddington. who at the time worked for the Church of England as the Archbishops' Secretary for Appointments. She retired in 2021.

Styles
 The Reverend Alastair Redfern (1976–1987)
 The Reverend Canon Alastair Redfern (1987–1997)
 The Right Reverend Alastair Redfern (1997–2001)
 The Right Reverend Doctor Alastair Redfern (2001–present)

References

External links

1948 births
Alumni of Christ Church, Oxford
Alumni of Ripon College Cuddesdon
Bishops of Grantham
Bishops of Derby
20th-century Church of England bishops
21st-century Church of England bishops
Living people